Cyril Tyler (26 January 1911 – 25 January 1996) was an English cricketer. He played for Gloucestershire between 1936 and 1938.

References

External links

1911 births
1996 deaths
English cricketers
Gloucestershire cricketers
People from Ossett
Sportspeople from Yorkshire